Humber is an unincorporated community in Coahoma County, Mississippi, United States.

Humber had a post office in the early 1900s, and was then located directly on the Mississippi River.

The Humber Archeological Site is located west of Humber on Island No. 63 in the Mississippi River.

The Mississippi Levee now lies between the town and the river.

References

Unincorporated communities in Coahoma County, Mississippi
Mississippi populated places on the Mississippi River
Unincorporated communities in Mississippi